Events from the year 1991 in Michigan.

Office holders

State office holders
 Governor of Michigan: John Engler (Republican)
 Lieutenant Governor of Michigan: Connie Binsfeld (Republican) 
 Michigan Attorney General: Frank J. Kelley (Democrat)
 Michigan Secretary of State: Richard H. Austin (Democrat)
 Speaker of the Michigan House of Representatives: Lewis N. Dodak (Democrat)
 Majority Leader of the Michigan Senate: Dick Posthumus (Republican)
 Chief Justice, Michigan Supreme Court:

Mayors of major cities
 Mayor of Detroit: Coleman Young
 Mayor of Grand Rapids: Gerald R. Helmholdt
 Mayor of Flint: Matthew S. Collier/Woodrow Stanley
 Mayor of Lansing: Terry John McKane
 Mayor of Ann Arbor: Gerald Jernigan/Elizabeth Brater

Federal office holders

 U.S. Senator from Michigan: Donald W. Riegle Jr. (Democrat)
 U.S. Senator from Michigan: Carl Levin (Democrat) 
 House District 1: John Conyers (Democrat)
 House District 2: Carl Pursell (Republican)
 House District 3: Howard Wolpe (Republican)
 House District 4: Fred Upton (Republican)
 House District 5: Paul B. Henry (Republican)
 House District 6: Bob Carr (Democrat)
 House District 7: Dale Kildee (Democrat)
 House District 8: J. Bob Traxler (Democrat)
 House District 9: Guy Vander Jagt (Republican)
 House District 10: Dave Camp (Republican)
 House District 11: Robert William Davis (Republican)
 House District 12: David Bonior (Democrat)
 House District 13: Barbara-Rose Collins (Democrat)
 House District 14: Dennis M. Hertel (Democrat)
 House District 15: William D. Ford (Democrat)
 House District 16: John Dingell (Democrat)
 House District 17: Sander Levin (Democrat)
 House District 18: William Broomfield (Republican)

Population

Sports

Baseball
 1991 Detroit Tigers season – Under manager Sparky Anderson, the Tigers compiled an 83–79 record and finished second in American League East. The team's statistical leaders included Tony Phillips with a .284 batting average, Cecil Fielder with 44 home runs and 133 RBIs, Bill Gullickson with 20 wins, and Mike Henneman with a 2.88 earned run average.

American football
 1991 Detroit Lions season – Under head coach Wayne Fontes, the Lions compiled a 12–4 record and finished first in the NFC Central Division. The team's statistical leaders included Erik Kramer with 1,635 passing yards, Barry Sanders with 1,548 rushing yards and 102 points scored, and Brett Perriman with 668 receiving yards.
 1991 Michigan Wolverines football team – Under head coach Gary Moeller, the Wolverines compiled a 10–2 record, won the Big Ten Conference championship, lost to Washington in the 1992 Rose Bowl, and were ranked No. 6 in the final AP poll. The team's statistical leaders included Elvis Grbac with 2,085 passing yards, Ricky Powers with 1,197 rushing yards, and Desmond Howard with 985 receiving yards and 138 points scored.
 1991 Michigan State Spartans football team – Under head coach George Perles, the Spartans compiled a 3–8 record. The team's statistical leaders included Jim Miller with 1,368 passing yards, Tico Duckett with 1,204 rushing yards, Courtney Hawkins with 656 receiving yards, and Jim DelVerne with 52 points scored.

Basketball
 1990–91 Detroit Pistons season – Under head coach Chuck Daly, the Pistons compiled a 50–32 record, finished second in the NBA's Central Division, and lost to the Chicago Bulls in the East Conference Finals. The team's statistical leaders included Joe Dumars with 1,809 points scored, Isaiah Thomas with 671 assists, and Dennis Rodman with 1,132 rebounds.

Ice hockey
 1990–91 Detroit Red Wings season – Under head coach Bryan Murray, the Red Wings compiled a 34–38–8 record and finished third in the NHL Norris Division. Steve Yzerman led the team with 51 goals, 57 assists, and 108 points. The team's goaltenders included Glen Hanlon (19 games) and Tim Cheveldae (65 games).

Music and culture
 February 23 - Madonna's single Rescue Me was released and rose to No. 9 on the Billboard Hot 100.
 August 27 - Bob Seger's album The Fire Inside was released.

Chronology of events

January

February

March

April

May

June

July

August

September

October

November

December

Births

Gallery of 1990 births

Deaths
 February 6 - Danny Thomas, a native of Deerfield, Michigan, entertainer, and star of Make Room for Daddy (1953–1964), at age 79 in Los Angeles
 February 20 - John Fetzer, television executive and former owner of the Detroit Tigers, at age 89 in Honolulu
 March 19 - Russ Thomas, player for Detroit Lions (1946-1949) and GM of the club (1967-1989)
 June 1 - David Ruffin, Motown singer and member of The Temptations, at age 50 in Philadelphia
 September 18 - Rob Tyner, lead singer of the MC5, at age 46
 November 10 - Dick the Bruiser, professional wrestler, at age 62 in Tampa, Florida

Gallery of 1990 deaths

See also
 History of Michigan
 History of Detroit

References